Don Castro Regional Recreation Area is a regional park located in Hayward, California. It is part of the East Bay Regional Parks system.

External links
Don Castro Regional Recreation Area web page

East Bay Regional Park District
Parks in Hayward, California